Ahmet Didarovich Atayev or Ahmet Didarowiç Ataýew (Turkmen Cyrillic: Ахмет Дидарович Атаев; ; born 19 September 1990) is a Turkmen footballer who plays as a midfielder for Ýokary Liga club Altyn Asyr FK and the Turkmenistan national team.

Club career
He started playing football at 6 years old. His first coach was Atamyrat Jumamuradov, in Youth sport school of Bagyr (Ahal Region).

He began his professional career in Ashgabat; from 2007 to 2010 he played for FC Talyp Sporty.

The first half of the 2011 season was held in FC Aşgabat. The second part of the 2011 season, he played for FC HTTU, which included winning the Cup of Turkmenistan for the first time. In 2013, he became the first champion 2013 Ýokary Liga.

Since 2014, Ataýew has played for Altyn Asyr FK. As part of the team, he won the title of champion of Turkmenistan in 2014 and 2015, the 2015 Turkmenistan Cup, and the 2015 Turkmenistan Super Cup. At the end of the 2015 season, Ataýew was voted the best player of 2015 Ýokary Liga.

From August 2017, he began performing in Indonesia's Super League for the Arema, which included 25 games and scored 3 goals. In June 2018 moved to the new Indonesian club Persela, which he played for until the end of the 2018 year.

On 15 May 2019, Ataýew signed by Malaysian Premier League club Sabah FA as one of two imports to fill their vacant player slots. Ataýew became part of the team squad that emerged as the champion of 2019 Malaysia Premier League since the team last lifted their old first division title back in 1996, subsequently qualifying them into the 2020 Malaysia Super League. In the team match against Kelantan FA, Ataýew notably scored the winning goal from a ball given by his teammate through corner kick in the 58th minute.

International career

He played for the Olympic team of Turkmenistan in the Asian Football Confederation's Pre-Olympic Tournament.

Ataýew  made his senior national team debut on 27 January 2012, in an friendly match against Romania. The captain of the national team from 2015.

International goals
Scores and results list Turkmenistan's goal tally first.

Honors

Club
 Best player of  Ýokary Liga: 2015
Altyn Asyr
 Ýokary Liga (1): 2014, 2015
Turkmenistan Cup (1): 2015
Turkmenistan Super Cup (1): 2015
FC HTTU
Ýokary Liga (1): 2013
Turkmenistan Cup (1): 2011
Sabah FA
Malaysia Premier League (1): 2019

International
AFC Challenge Cup
Runners-up: 2012

References

External links

Ahmet ATAYEV at FIFA.com

Turkmenistan international footballers
Association football midfielders
Living people
Turkmenistan footballers
1982 births
FC Aşgabat players
Arema F.C. players
Sabah F.C. (Malaysia) players
Persela Lamongan players
Sportspeople from Ashgabat
Turkmenistan expatriate footballers
Expatriate footballers in Indonesia
Turkmenistan expatriate sportspeople in Indonesia
Expatriate footballers in Malaysia
Turkmenistan expatriate sportspeople in Malaysia
2019 AFC Asian Cup players
FC Altyn Asyr players